James Stevenson, 1st Baron Stevenson, GCMG (2 April 1873 – 10 June 1926), known as Sir James Stevenson, Bt, between 1917 and 1924, was a British businessman and civil servant.

Education
Stevenson was educated at the Kilmarnock Academy. It would appear that his education there was interrupted – perhaps because his parents had had to withdraw him due to an inability to pay school fees – for when he enrolled in 1887 he had a previous admission number.

Career
Stevenson joined the Johnnie Walker whisky blending company in 1888, working his way up to become its joint Managing Director. He is credited with having come up with the company's advertising slogan 'Born in 1820 – still going strong'. During the First World War he was appointed to a senior position in the Ministry of Munitions and in return for his service was created a Baronet, of Walton Heath in the Parish of Walton-on-the-Hill in the County of Surrey, on 11 April 1917. After the war he continued in government service and from 1921 he worked as a personal adviser to Winston Churchill, then Secretary of State for the Colonies. Immediately after the First World War he was responsible for the Stevenson Plan, which was an effort by the UK government to stabilise low rubber prices after a world glut of rubber.

Stevenson was appointed a Knight Grand Cross of the Order of St Michael and St George (GCMG) in the 1922 New Year Honours.

Stevenson later chaired the Standing Committee responsible for the British Empire Exhibition (1924–25). London's Wembley Stadium had been built as a temporary home for the exhibition, but Scotsman Stevenson fought successfully to prevent its demolition and it continued as an English national stadium into the 21st Century. He was raised to the peerage as Baron Stevenson, of Holmbury in the County of Surrey, on 7 May 1924, during the first premiership of Ramsay MacDonald. He was the first person from Kilmarnock to be elevated to the peerage.

Writings
According to his obituary, in 1912 he published a novel, The Kiss of Chance (published by Eveleigh Nash, London, pp. 301), under the pseudonym Roland Dunster. A second novel was An Incurable Disease which The Strand Magazine says was illustrated by Septimus Edwin Scott.

Personal life
Lord Stevenson died on 10 June 1926, aged 53, when the baronetcy and barony became extinct.

Political relatives
John Keith McBroom Laird (1907–1985) Canadian Senator – 2nd cousin, once removed
Sir Alexander Stewart Stevenson (1860–1936) Edinburgh Lord Provost – uncle
Stewart Stevenson (1946– ) Member of the Scottish Parliament (2001– ), Minister for Transport, Infrastructure and Climate Change (2007–2010), Minister for Environment and Climate Change (2011–2012) – 1st cousin, once removed

References

1873 births
1926 deaths
People educated at Kilmarnock Academy
British civil servants
Barons in the Peerage of the United Kingdom
Knights Grand Cross of the Order of St Michael and St George
Barons created by George V